The 1965 Oakland Raiders season was the team's sixth in both Oakland and the American Football League. The campaign saw the team attempt to improve upon the prior year's disappointing 5–7–2 record, and finished at 8–5–1. While the effort was a definite improvement, it was not enough to win the division and secure a postseason berth. This was the third and last season for Al Davis as head coach, as he became the AFL commissioner in April 1966, and offensive backs coach John Rauch was promoted.

This was the first of sixteen consecutive winning seasons for the Raiders. It is also notable for the debut of Hall of Fame wide receiver Fred Biletnikoff, the first of several legendary Raiders drafted in the mid-1960s to early 1970s. The eleventh overall selection of the AFL draft out of Florida State, he was an integral part of the team's 1967 and 1976 Super Bowl runs.

It was also the Raiders' last year at Frank Youell Field; they moved to the new Oakland–Alameda County Coliseum in 1966.

Roster

Season

Regular season

Game summaries

Week 1

Standings

References

Oakland
Oakland Raiders seasons
Oakland